is a Japanese actor. He is represented with Horipro Booking Agency. His father is actor and singer Ryōtarō Sugi.

He graduated from Seijo Gakuen Primary School. After graduating from junior high and high school in Hawaii, he also graduated from Pepperdine University Department of Asian Studies and Department of International Relations. His notable works include Roosevelt Game.

Biography
Transferred from the University of Hawaii, he graduated from Department of Pepperdine University International Relations, in the United States and in 1997, he went on to play as Junnosuke Mochizuki on the NHK Asadora Aguri to debut his acting career. After that, he is active in films, television dramas and stage, including the popular Tokyo Broadcasting System drama Mito Kōmon (as Atsumi Kakunoshin) and the film Merdeka 17805 (in which he starred).

In 2013, he wrote a book about Setsuzo Kotsuji, who helped the Jewish refugees arriving at Vladivostok at the Trans-Siberian Railway under the persecution of Nazi Germany and travelled to the country of desire, Inochi no Visa o Tsunaida Otoko — Setsuzo Kotsuji to Yudaya Nanmin (A Man who Connected the Visa of Life — Setsuzo Kotsuji and the Jewish Refugees) and debuted as a non-fiction writer.

In his private life, he and former Mito Kōmon actress Kei Takyo married in the spring of 2016, in which they had been dating in 2001. Their first child was a girl born on 19 December 2016.

Filmography

Film

TV dramas

Variety

Stage

Bibliography

References

External links
 
 – Ameba Blog (Aug 2011 – ) 

Japanese male actors
Horipro artists
People from Tokyo
1973 births
Living people